Castlevania: Rondo of Blood, originally released in Japan as  is a platform-adventure video game developed by Konami for the PC Engine's Super CD-ROM² System directed by Toru Hagihara. Part of the Castlevania series, protagonist Richter Belmont goes to save his lover Annette, who was abducted by Dracula.  It was first released exclusively in Japan on October 29, 1993. A direct sequel, Castlevania: Symphony of the Night, was released worldwide in 1997.

The game was remade for the Super Nintendo Entertainment System as Castlevania: Dracula X in 1995, and the PlayStation Portable as Castlevania: The Dracula X Chronicles in 2007. In 2008, the original game was released for the Wii's Virtual Console service in Japan and for the North American and PAL regions in 2010. In 2018, the game was included along with Symphony of the Night within the Castlevania Requiem collection for the PlayStation 4. The title is also playable on the TurboGrafx-16 Mini. In 2021, Limited Run Games  announced an English release for the TurboDuo.

Gameplay

The objective is to guide the primary player character Richter Belmont through nine stages, with four alternate routes, as he searches for his kidnapped beloved Annette and ultimately confronts Dracula in his castle. Richter makes use of a whip as his main weapon and one of six sub-weapons: an axe, a dagger, holy water, a grimoire, a pocket watch, and a cross. While exploring the castle, Richter can rescue four maidens, including his distant relative Maria Renard who then becomes a playable character. She attacks using her doves and one of six sub-weapons: a white tiger kitten, dragon whelp, baby phoenix, turtle, egg or musical notes. She is more agile, can do a double jump, and can do twice the amount of damage that Richter does in each normal attack because the doves she shoots out return to her and therefore can do a second hit of damage on the way back, but she takes much more damage each time she is hit.

Rondo of Blood incorporates elements from the earlier Castlevania games which typically featured linear gameplay and a member of the Belmont clan as the protagonist, and the later entries which emphasized untimed exploration of the environment. Rondo of Blood makes use of untimed stages with a clear beginning, but more than one ending to some levels; this then affects the subsequent environment, monsters, and boss monster that the player character encounters at the end of the level. Items such as money, hearts, and food can be found scattered throughout the areas. Rondo of Blood also features the Item Crash ability reused in subsequent Castlevania titles, which allows a sub-weapon to be used in a super attack. Its direct sequel, Castlevania: Symphony of the Night, reuses many of the monsters.

Plot
Taking place in 1792, Rondo of Blood is set in the fictional universe of the Castlevania series. The story centers around the eternal conflict between the vampire hunters of the Belmont Clan and the immortal vampire Dracula, who has once again been resurrected. The protagonist is 19-year-old Richter Belmont (Jin Horikawa / David Vincent), heir to the whip "Vampire Killer" and Simon Belmont's direct descendant. He comes to the castle after his beloved Annette (Atsuko Honda / Jessica Straus) is kidnapped by Dracula's servant, Shaft, as bait for a trap. Richter makes his way through Dracula's castle, defeating his minions, including the spirit of Death, a headless knight, and a minotaur, all of whom attempt to stop Richter. Along the way, Richter can free various women kidnapped by Dracula's servants to feed him, including his distant relative Maria Renard (Yōko Teppōzuka / Michelle Ruff), an orphaned 12-year-old who insists on joining him; Terra (Hiromi Murata / Karen Strassman), a nun who mistakes him for a manifestation of God; Iris (Akie Yasuda / Karen Strassman), the daughter of the village doctor; and finally Annette. After vanquishing Shaft (or Annette, who has been turned into a vampire, if he fails to rescue her in time, though this is only in the PSP version, not the original release), Richter confronts Dracula (Hiroya Ishimaru / Patrick Seitz) and defeats him before exposing him to sunlight, causing him to vanish. Dracula's castle then collapses into the sea as Richter escapes on horseback.

Development
Rondo of Blood is the tenth installment of the Castlevania video game series (hence the Japanese title). Produced by Konami, Rondo of Blood originally saw only a Japanese release on the PC Engine on October 29, 1993. Later, a port was released on the Wii for the Japanese Virtual Console on April 22, 2008; as an import, it became available in North America on March 15, 2010 and in the PAL region (Europe and Australia) on March 19, 2010.

Audio
Rondo of Blood makes use of Red Book Audio along with the onboard soundchip, allowing for better musical quality. Akira Souji, Keizo Nakamura, Tomoko Sano, and Mikio Saito composed the soundtrack of Rondo of Blood. The songs from Rondo of Blood, "Overture", "Beginning" and "Opus 13", appeared on a pre-order bonus CD for the 2006 Nintendo DS game Castlevania: Portrait of Ruin.

Konami Style published the two-disk soundtrack of the remake of the game, Castlevania: The Dracula X Chronicles, on November 8, 2007. The songs "Vampire Killer", "Beginning", "Cemetery", and "Divine Bloodlines" were rearranged; it also included a bonus track of an English-language version of "Nocturne" from Symphony of the Night. Within The Dracula X Chronicles is an option which enables players to choose songs from Rondo of Blood and Symphony of the Night to play in the background. These songs are found in the form of records hidden within the game.

Remakes and re-releases

Castlevania: Dracula X

Castlevania: Dracula X was developed for the Super Nintendo Entertainment System. While the plot is similar to Rondo of Blood and it uses many of that game's graphics, it features all-new levels and altered gameplay elements instead of being a straight port due to the limitations of the cartridge format and PC Engine exclusivity obligations. It was released on July 21, 1995 in Japan, in September 1995 in the US, February 22, 1996 in Europe, and on June 22, 1996 in Australia. The game was also released as a Wii U Virtual Console download in Japan on April 23, 2014, in North America on October 2, 2014 and the PAL regions on November 13, 2014. It was released again for New Nintendo 3DS Virtual Console download in North America on December 29, 2016, and in Europe and Australia on January 26, 2017.

The game was also re-released as a part of the Castlevania Advance Collection on September 23, 2021 for the Nintendo Switch, PlayStation 4, Xbox One and Windows. It was bundled alongside Game Boy Advance games Castlevania: Circle of the Moon, Castlevania: Harmony of Dissonance, and Castlevania: Aria of Sorrow.

Castlevania: The Dracula X Chronicles

Castlevania: The Dracula X Chronicles is a 2.5D remake of Rondo of Blood for the PlayStation Portable. It includes the original PC Engine game (with both Japanese and English voices) and a port of its sequel, Symphony of the Night, available as an unlockable secret embedded within the base game. Symphony of the Night now includes the option to play as Maria (by using a secret name code after beating the game as Alucard), as well as redone scripts, sound effects, new voice acting and the option to play with the original Japanese voices, which is unchanged in this port. Gameplay in The Dracula X Chronicles remains largely unchanged from Rondo of Blood. However, a Boss Rush mode was added, and completing it three times unlocks the mini-game Peke.

It was released in North America on October 23, 2007, in Japan on November 8, 2007, in Europe on February 15, 2008 and in Australia & New Zealand on April 9, 2008. In 2008, the North American edition was re-released as part of the "Greatest Hits" label while the Japanese edition was re-released on July 15, 2010 under the "Best Selection" label. The game was added to the PlayStation Network in Europe in June 2014, as a PSP-only release (the game is already compatible with the PS Vita).

Castlevania Requiem
Rondo of Blood is included within the Castlevania Requiem compilation for PlayStation 4 along with its sequel, Symphony of the Night. Both titles are based on the retranslated versions featured in  The Dracula X Chronicles, though only the 2D sprite-based version of Rondo of Blood is included. The bonus mini-game Peke can be played by inputting the Konami Code in the Main Menu.

Reception

Reception of the PC Engine's Rondo of Blood was positive. Electronic Gaming Monthly stated that it "can easily be the best CD title yet", and argued that the only negative aspect is that it would not be released in the USA. They later awarded the game Best Japanese Action Game of 1994. GamePro commented, "Declaring Dracula X to be the greatest Castlevania of all time would be a slap at Castlevania IV for the SNES, but earmarking X as one of the ten best side-scrollers of all time is a no-brainer." IGN awarded the Wii port its "Editors' Choice" and described it as enjoyable and "worth the wait". Corbie Dillard of Nintendo Life praised the level design, soundtrack, graphics, and level difficulty.

In other media
Following the release of the final season of the original Castlevania animated series on May 13, 2021, that was based on Castlevania III: Dracula's Curse, Netflix announced a follow-up series that is to be set in France during the French Revolution in 1792 with Richter Belmont and Maria Renard in the lead roles. At 2022's Netflix's Geeked Week virtual event, it was announced that the series is titled Castlevania: Nocturne alongside a teaser trailer featuring Richter.

Notes

References

1993 video games
1990s horror video games
Konami games
Video games with 2.5D graphics
Rondo of Blood
TurboGrafx-CD games
Super Nintendo Entertainment System games
Video games featuring female protagonists
Virtual Console games for Wii
Virtual Console games for Wii U
PlayStation Portable games
PlayStation 4 games
Video games set in the 18th century
Fiction set in 1792
Gargoyles in popular culture
Multiplayer and single-player video games
Platform games
Video games developed in Japan